Wolcott is an unincorporated town, a post office, and a census-designated place (CDP) located in and governed by Eagle County, Colorado, United States. The CDP is a part of the Edwards, CO Micropolitan Statistical Area. The Wolcott post office has the ZIP Code 81655 (post office boxes). At the United States Census 2010, the population of the Wolcott CDP was 15, while the population of the 81655 ZIP Code Tabulation Area was 65 including adjacent areas.

History
The Wolcott Post Office has been in operation since 1889. The community was named after Edward O. Wolcott, a United States Senator from Colorado.

Geography
Wolcott is located in central Eagle County in the valley of the Eagle River, a west-flowing tributary of the Colorado River. U.S. Route 6 passes through the community, following the river, while Interstate 70 forms the southern edge of the CDP, with access from Exit 157. Colorado State Highway 131 intersects I-70 at Exit 157, passes through the center of Wolcott, and leads north  to Steamboat Springs.

Demographics

See also

Outline of Colorado
Index of Colorado-related articles
State of Colorado
Colorado cities and towns
Colorado census designated places
Colorado counties
Eagle County, Colorado
Colorado metropolitan areas
Edwards, CO Micropolitan Statistical Area

References

External links

Wolcott @ Colorado.com
Wolcott @ UncoverColorado.com
Eagle County website

Census-designated places in Eagle County, Colorado
Census-designated places in Colorado